June Moon is a 1931 American Pre-Code comedy film based upon the play of the same name by George S. Kaufman and Ring Lardner. It was adapted by Vincent Lawrence, Joseph L. Mankiewicz and Keene Thompson and directed by A. Edward Sutherland. It stars Jack Oakie, Frances Dee, Wynne Gibson, Harry Akst and June MacCloy. The film was released on March 21, 1931, by Paramount Pictures.

Plot
Aspiring lyricist Fred Stevens leaves Schenectady for New York City, with hopes of making it big in the songwriting business.

Cast
Jack Oakie as Frederick Martin Stevens
Frances Dee as Edna Baker
Wynne Gibson as Lucille Sears
Harry Akst as Maxie Schwartz
June MacCloy as Eileen Fletcher
Ernest Wood as Paul Sears
Harold Waldridge as Young Goebel
Sam Hardy as Sam Hart
Ethel Kenyon as Goldie 
Frank Darien as Window Cleaner
Jean Laverty as Miss Rixey 
Eddie Dunn as Joe McCloskey

References

External links
 

1931 films
American comedy films
1931 comedy films
Paramount Pictures films
Films directed by A. Edward Sutherland
American black-and-white films
1930s English-language films
1930s American films
Films set in New York City